Dublin, also known as Raif or Raif Branch, is an unincorporated community in Montgomery County, Alabama, United States. A post office operated under the name Raif Branch from 1870 to 1894 and under the name Raif from 1894 to 1905.

References

Unincorporated communities in Montgomery County, Alabama
Unincorporated communities in Alabama